Shishma (Şişmä) is a rural locality (a village) in Ibrayevsky Selsoviet, Alsheyevsky District, Bashkortostan, Russia. The population was 158 as of 2010. There are 2 streets.

Geography 
Shishma is located 14 km south of Rayevsky (the district's administrative centre) by road.

References 

Rural localities in Alsheyevsky District